PP-216 Multan-VI is a Constituency of Provincial Assembly of Punjab.

General elections 2013

General elections 2008

See also
 PP-215 Multan-V
 PP-217 Multan-VII

References

External links
 Election commission Pakistan's official website
 Awazoday.com check result
 Official Website of Government of Punjab

Constituencies of Punjab, Pakistan